Dubrova is a rural locality (a village) in Chushevitskoye Rural Settlement, Verkhovazhsky District, Vologda Oblast, Russia. The population was 11 as of 2002.

Geography 
The distance to Verkhovazhye is 53.8 km, to Chushevitsy is 10 km. Tolstukha, Vladykina Gora, Spirino, Kaychikha are the nearest rural localities.

References 

Rural localities in Verkhovazhsky District